St James' Church in West End, Hampshire is an Anglican parish church in the Borough of Eastleigh. The church building is grade II listed.

History 
The church was founded on 18 April 1836 with the first church building being completed in 1838. The new structure was designed by Sir Arthur Blomfield in a 15th century gothic style. The intention was to include a tower at the western end of the church, but this was never built.

On 14 February 1983 the church building was listed as a grade II historic building.

Footballer Alan Shearer was married in the church in June 1991.

References 

Borough of Eastleigh
Church of England church buildings in Hampshire
Churches completed in 1890
Arthur Blomfield church buildings